Shivganj  was a village development committee in Jhapa District in the Province No. 1 of south-eastern Nepal. At the time of the 1991 Nepal census it had a population of 13,619 people living in 2,490 individual households. It was later merged with Satasidham, Dharampur, and Panchgachhi to form the Shivasatakshi municipality.

References

Populated places in Jhapa District